The 1986 California Angels season was the franchise's 26th season and ended with the Angels losing the American League Championship Series in dramatic fashion.

The regular season ended with the Angels finishing 1st in the American League West with a record of 92-70, earning the franchise's third division title. After jumping to a 3-1 series lead over the Boston Red Sox in the best-of-seven ALCS, the Angels blew a 3-run lead in the 9th inning of Game 5 that included giving up a two-out, two-strike home run to Boston's Dave Henderson (in other words, the Angels were 1 strike away from the World Series). The Angels went on to lose Game 5 in extra innings, and eventually lost the next two games and the series.

After 1986, the Angels went into a lengthy playoff drought, not returning to the postseason until their championship season of 2002 (though they did come close in 1995). They would not win a division title again until 2004.

Offseason
November 19, 1985: DeWayne Buice was signed as a free agent with the California Angels.
 December 5, 1985: Don Sutton was signed as a free agent by the Angels.
 December 20, 1985: Daryl Sconiers was released by the Angels.
December 20, 1985: Geoff Zahn was released by the California Angels.

Regular season
 May 4, 1986: Reggie Jackson hit the 537th home run of his career off Boston Red Sox pitcher Roger Clemens, passing Mickey Mantle on the all-time home run list.
 June 18, 1986: Don Sutton won the 300th game of his career. Sutton became the 19th pitcher in MLB history to win 300 games.
 September 18, 1986: Reggie Jackson had 3 home runs and 7 RBIs in one game.

Season standings

Record vs. opponents

Notable transactions
June 2, 1986: Alan Mills was drafted by the California Angels in the 1st round (8th pick) of the 1986 amateur draft (Secondary Phase). Player signed June 10, 1986.

Roster

Game log

Regular season

|-

|-

|-

|- style="text-align:center; background:#bbcaff;"
| colspan="12" | 57th All-Star Game in Houston, Texas
|-

|-

|-

|-

|- style="text-align:center;"
| Legend:       = Win       = Loss       = PostponementBold = Angels team member

Postseason Game log

|-

|- style="text-align:center;"
| Legend:       = Win       = Loss       = PostponementBold = Angels team member

Player stats

Batting

Starters by position
Note: Pos = Position; G = Games played; AB = At bats; H = Hits; Avg. = Batting average; HR = Home runs; RBI = Runs batted in

Other batters
Note: G = Games played; AB = At bats; H = Hits; Avg. = Batting average; HR = Home runs; RBI = Runs batted in

Pitching

Starting pitchers 
Note" G = Games pitched; IP = Innings pitched; W = Wins; L = Losses; ERA = Earned run average; SO = Strikeouts

Other pitchers 
Note: G = Games pitched; IP = Innings pitched; W = Wins; L = Losses; ERA = Earned run average; SO = Strikeouts

Relief pitchers 
Note: G = Games pitched; W = Wins; L = Losses; SV = Saves; ERA = Earned run average; SO = Strikeouts

ALCS

Farm system

References

1986 California Angels at Baseball Reference
1986 California Angels  at Baseball Almanac

Los Angeles Angels seasons
American League West champion seasons
Los
Los